Pitiniana was an ancient city of Sicily on the overland road from Agrigentum (modern Agrigento) to Panormus (modern Palermo).  Its precise location is unknown, but is supposed to be near the present cities of Aragona and Raffadali.

References

O. Belvedere, “Sulla via Agrigento-Palermo,” in C. Interdonato (ed.), Viabilità antica in Sicilia, Atti del 3° Convegno di Studi, Archeoclub di Giarre, sede di Giarre Riposto, pp. 71–73, Giarre, 1988.
V. Giustolisi, La Petra di Calathansuderj e la “statio Pitiniana”, Palermo, 1988.
E. Manni, Geografia fisica e politica della Sicilia antica, Rome, 1981.p. 220

Ancient cities in Sicily
Lost ancient cities and towns
Former populated places in Italy